Stuart Simmonds (born 23 January 1967) is an English cricketer and author.  Simmonds is a right-handed batsman who bowls right-arm medium-fast.  He was born at Birmingham.

Simmonds represented the Sussex Cricket Board in a single List A match against Hertfordshire in the 1999 NatWest Trophy.  In his only List A match, he scored an unbeaten 14 runs, while taking a 2 wickets at a bowling average of 25.00, with figures of 2/50.

Autobiography
Simmonds' autobiography "Watching With My Heroes" , with a foreword by Derek Pringle was published in October 2017 with a book launch at The Folly in London on 31 October 2017 attended by both Derek Pringle and David Gower; cited by Simmonds in the book as the reason he became a Cricketer.

Stuart has recently released an updated edition of his autobiography with additional chapters and with a foreword by David Bowden MBE from Sussex Cricket.

Stuart is also currently a Vice President of the Sussex Cricket Foundation, the charity arm of Sussex Cricket.

Children's Fiction

Hannah the Spanner 

In 2019 Simmonds initially published the first six Hannah the Spanner books, with a seventh released in November 2019 in the "Hannah the Spanner" series, with illustrations by Bill Greenhead.

 Hannah the Spanner and the Dancing Bear 
 Hannah the Spanner and the Robot 
 Hannah the Spanner and the Circus 
 Hannah the Spanner and the Trip to the Moon 
Hannah the Spanner and the Diamond Robbery  
Hannah the Spanner and the Racing Car 

Released on 7 November 2019 together with a book launch in Foyles, London on 27 November 2019:

 Hannah the Spanner and the Polar Bears 

An animated trailer narrated by Dawn French has also been released

Harry the Karate Monkey 

In September 2020 Simmonds released Harry the Karate Money, the first in a new series of books written for his second daughter Lucy, with several more to follow. 

 Harry the Karate Monkey 

Sevenhills Stories

Written around the town where both his characters Hannah and Lucy live, Simmonds penned the first three rhyming books in his Sevenhills Stories series which were released in January 2021. 

 What's the Plan Stan 
Parker and Rudi's Most Amazing Adventure 
 Don't touch that razor, Fraser 

Foreign Rights 

In March 2021, Simmonds signed a deal with Rightol Media Ltd, who acquired the rights to his back catalogue. This agreement will see his books sold and translated in 34 countries and languages.

References

External links
Stuart Simmonds at Cricinfo

1967 births
Living people
Cricketers from Birmingham, West Midlands
English cricketers
Sussex Cricket Board cricketers
English cricketers of 1969 to 2000